The defending champions were Elizabeth Smylie Janine Tremelling, but Smylie chose not to participate. Tremelling, partnered Jenny Byrne, but lost in the first round to Samantha Smith and Hellas ter Riet. Nicole Provis and Elna Reinach won the title, defeating Hana Mandlíková and Jana Novotná in the final, 6–2, 6–1.

Seeds 
The top four seeds received a bye to the second round.

Draw

Finals

Top half

Bottom half

References

External links 
 ITF tournament edition details

Virginia Slims of Chicago
WTA German Open
May 1990 sports events in Europe
1990 in German tennis